Coca-Cola Blak (stylized as Coca-Cola BlāK) was a coffee-flavored soft drink introduced by Coca-Cola in 2006 and discontinued in 2008. The mid-calorie drink was introduced first in France and subsequently in other markets, including Czech Republic, Slovakia, and Lithuania.

Coca-Cola Blak launched in the United States on April 3, and in Canada on August 29, 2006 in Toronto, Ontario, at Dundas Square.  In August 2007, trade magazine Beverage Digest noted that Coca-Cola would discontinue the drink within the United States.

The French and Canadian versions of Coca-Cola Blak were sweetened with sugar. The U.S. version of Coca-Cola Blak replaced sugar with high fructose corn syrup, aspartame, and acesulfame potassium. Consumer Reports taste-testers found the French version to be less sweet and to contain more coffee flavor.

The American and Canadian versions had a plastic resealable cap on a glass bottle that resembled the classic Coke bottle, where the French/Czech version was a bottle shape formed in aluminum.

In 2010, Coca-Cola FEMSA, the largest Coca-Cola bottler in Latin America, released coffee dispenser machines in Mexico under the brand name Blak.

In 2019, it was reported that Coca-Cola have started to plan an introduction of coffee-related products across 25 markets by the end of the year. The coffee has been planned to combine Coca-Cola with coffee, which will contain less caffeine than a regular cup of coffee but more than a regular can of Coke. This rollout, which started in European markets, culminated with the release of Coca-Cola with Coffee in the US on January 25, 2021.

Nutritional facts

See also 
Coffee-flavored Pepsi
Syrup, a 1999 novel featuring a plot revolving around a fictional but similar product

References

External links 

 Coca-Cola BlāK to make its worldwide debut The Coca-Cola Company, 2005-12-07
 Coca-Cola gives out thousands of Coke BlāK samples in Times Square

Coca-Cola cola brands
Products introduced in 2006
Coffee softdrinks
Products and services discontinued in 2008
Discontinued soft drinks